King of the Hill is a race game, where players try to be the first to get their marbles from the start to the top of the mountain. It was originally published by Schaper Toys in 1960. It was re-released in 2006 with slightly different rules by Winning Moves Games USA, but is no longer in production.

Gameplay (1960)
In the original Schaper game, players took turns moving marbles up a 3-D Mountain shaped board.  Each turn, a player would use an hourglass-shaped teeter-totter device to determine the amount of spaces they could move that turn.  They would then pick one of their marbles and move it along the board's path that number of spaces.  If the marble ends its move on a space where another marble is, it continues along to the next open space.  If the marble lands on a hole space, they drop their marble into the hole, where it comes out lower on the board.  If they managed to get their marble to the top of the mountain, they would drop it into a hole in the middle.  This could trigger a crown to pop up and the player would win.  If not, the player would start their marble back on the track.

Gameplay (2006)
The newer version has slightly different rules and a much different look.  The board now features a large crater in the center instead of a mountain and the board track winds around the crater, running along aside the crater at roughly the halfway point and end of the track.  Also gone are the holes in the track.  Instead, players with a marble on the track next to the crater are dropped into the crater of another player ends their turn on them.  A marble dropped into the crater this way comes out of one of three "caves" on corners of the board and is then placed back on the track on one of the spaces next to the "cave."  Additionally, the end game is totally different.  Instead of the mechanized crown, players instead try to be the first to get both their marbles into the "Finish Zone."

References

Board games introduced in 1960